Sławoborze Transmitter  is a 209 metre tall guyed mast for FM and TV situated at Sławoborze, West Pomeranian Voivodeship in Poland.

Transmitted Programmes

Digital television MPEG-4

FM Radio

See also

 List of masts

References

External links
 http://emi.emitel.pl/EMITEL/obiekty.aspx?obiekt=DODR_N2V
 http://radiopolska.pl/wykaz/pokaz_lokalizacja.php?pid=89
 http://www.przelaczenie.eu/mapy/zachodniopomorskie
 http://www.dvbtmap.eu/mapcoverage.html?chid=9387

Radio masts and towers in Poland
Świdwin County